The 1899 Rush Medical football team was an American football team that represented Rush Medical College in the 1899 college football season.  The Medics compiled a 3–3–1 record, against a plethora of major college football opponents, including Northwestern, Notre Dame, a 9–2 Wisconsin team, and an 8–0–1 Iowa eleven, all on the road.

Schedule

References

Rush Medical
Rush Medical College football seasons
Rush Medical football